Pelham is a city in Mitchell County, Georgia, United States. The population was 3,507 at the 2020 census, down from 3,898 in 2010. Pelham is well-known for its agriculture, with vast farming of cotton and pecans in the area.

History
Pelham was incorporated in 1881 and named in honor of Confederate officer John Pelham, who was born to a family of slave owners in northeastern Alabama in 1838.

Geography and climate
Pelham is in southeastern Mitchell County at  (31.126629, -84.152703), sitting at the crossroads of US 19 and State Route 93. U.S. 19 passes through the east side of the city and leads northwest  to Camilla, the county seat, and southeast  to Thomasville. State Route 93 passes through the center of town, leading northeast  to Sale City and south  to Cairo, while State Route 65 leads west from Pelham  to Hopeful.

Pelham has a humid subtropical climate, characterized by humid summers and mild winters. The average number of days with any measurable precipitation is 90. Pelham has on average 233 sunny days per year.

Demographics

2020 census

As of the 2020 United States census, there were 3,507 people, 1,325 households, and 857 families residing in the city.

2000 census
As of the census of 2000, there were 4,126 people, 1,467 households and 999 families in the city. The racial makeup of the city was 56.13% African American, 41.66% White, 0.24% Native American, 0.46% Asian, 0.02% Pacific Islander, 0.78% from other races, and 0.70% from two or more races. Hispanic or Latino of any race were 1.43% of the population.

There were 1,467 households, out of which 33.9% had children younger than 18 living with them, 35.2% were married couples living together, 28.4% had a female householder with no husband present, and 31.9% were non-families. 28.8% of all households were made up of individuals, and 14.7% had someone living alone who was 65 years of age or older. The average household size was 2.60 and the average family size was 3.21.

In the city, the population was spread out, with 32.1% younger than 18, 9.8% from 18 to 24, 23.1% from 25 to 44, 18.2% from 45 to 64, and 16.7% who were 65 or older. The median age was 33 years. For every 100 females, there were 90.0 males.  For every 100 females age 18 and older, there were 72.8 males.

The median income for a household in the city was $20,040, and the median income for a family was $24,968. Males had a median income of $21,476 versus $17,161 for females. The per capita income for the city was $10,703. About 29.6% of families and 33.6% of the population were below the poverty line, including 47.0% of those younger than 18 and 19.5% of those age 65 or older.

Education
The Pelham City School District holds pre-school to grade 12, and consists of one elementary school, a middle school and a high school. The district has 101 full-time teachers and over 1,627 students.

Pelham Elementary School
Pelham City Middle School
Pelham High School

Notable people
Donnie Cochran, former commander of the Blue Angels Precision Air team and first black member
Don Griffin, two-time Super Bowl winner with San Francisco 49'ers

References

Cities in Georgia (U.S. state)
Cities in Mitchell County, Georgia